Guccione is an Italian language surname, which is derived from the given name Guccio. The name may refer to:

Bob Guccione (1930–2010), American magazine publisher
Bob Guccione, Jr. (born 1955), American magazine publisher
Chris Guccione (tennis) (born 1985), Australian tennis player
Chris Guccione (umpire) (born 1974), American baseball umpire
Juanita Guccione (née Anita Rice; 1904–1999), American painter and taxidermist

References

Italian-language surnames